Shiluach haken ("sending-away the nest") is the Jewish law derived from the Torah that enjoins one to scare away the mother bird before taking her young or her eggs.  This only applies to Kosher birds in the wild.  The Torah promises longevity to someone who performs this commandment.

Sources
The commandment is found in :

Theological ramifications

Compassion or cruelty?
Rabbi Natan Slifkin has described two different approaches which Jewish thinkers have historically taken to this commandment. According to the "rationalist" approach, the purpose of the commandment is compassion: either to spare the mother bird the distress of seeing its eggs taken, or to limit the greed inherent in killing animals for one's use, or a similar reason. Whereas the "mystical" approach sees the commandment as an act of cruelty to the bird rather than compassion: in fact, the bird's suffering causes God to consider Israel's suffering at the hands of its enemies, and thus leads God to rescue Israel.

This dispute has practical ramifications, as the "rationalist" approach rules the commandment can only be done when one plans to eat the eggs (thus minimizing the birds' pain when pain is unavoidable), while the "mystical" approach calls on Jews to shoo away any mother bird even if they do not plan to take the eggs (thus maximizing the birds' pain).

Theodicy
As this is one of the few individual commandments for which a specific reward is promised in the text, it became a locus classicus in Talmudic literature for discussion of theodicy.

One example of this is in Kiddushin 39b which discusses the problem whether the reward for commandments is in this world or the next. The explanation given in Pirkei Avot, is that the reward isn’t in this world, but rather in Olam Habah, the next world.

In addition, the Talmud famously records that Elisha ben Abuyah saw a child fall off the ladder while performing this commandment at the behest of his parents: so, while performing two mitzvot, both of which are notable for their unique promise of a reward of longevity. This irreconcilable lack of theodicy led him away from Judaism. The Talmud says had Elisha known that reward for a Mitzva is only in the next world, he would not have left Judaism.

Cultural references
The metaphor of Shiluach haken is used in David Vollach's 2007 movie My Father My Lord, where the main character shoos away a mother bird just before the death of his own son, after the mother was "sent away" from the boy.

References

 http://hebrewbooks.org/41298

External links
List of sources on the reasoning behind Shiluach haken (Hebrew)
The Mitzvah of Shiluach Ha-Kan Heavily cited with halakhic sources, by Rabbi Doniel Neustadt (Modern Orthodox, Young Israel, Cleveland Heights)

Jewish ethical law
Positive Mitzvoth